Rumenan (also Romanized as Rūmenān) is a village in Qohab-e Rastaq Rural District, Amirabad District, Damghan County, Semnan Province, Iran. At the 2006 census, its population was 14, in 5 families.

References 

Populated places in Damghan County